Lynn Copeland (born 1960 in Huntington, New York) is a state representative in the Maine House of Representatives, representing the 14th district.

Political career
Copeland was elected to the Maine House of Representatives in 2020. She is a member of the Democratic Party. She previously served on the Saco City Council as the member for Ward 4.

2021-2022 Maine House Committee Assignments
State and Local Government Committee

References

External links
Official website
Representative Lynn H. Copeland

1960 births
People from Saco, Maine
Democratic Party members of the Maine House of Representatives
Living people
Women state legislators in Maine
21st-century American women politicians
21st-century American politicians